Members of the Junior Reserve Officer Training Corps are assigned various ranks, the titles and insignia of which are based on those used by the United States Armed Forces (and its various ROTCs), specifically the United States Army, U.S. Marine Corps, U.S. Navy, U.S. Air Force, U.S Space Force, and the U.S. Coast Guard. Rank requirements vary with schools. Some specialties require cadets to pass promotion tests while others only require recommendations by superiors and the needs of the unit.

Cadet Officer Ranks

Cadet Enlisted Ranks

See also 
 Cadet grades and insignia of the Civil Air Patrol
 Ranks of the cadet forces of the United Kingdom
 Cadets Canada Elemental Ranks
 New Zealand Cadet Forces ranks
 Australian Defence Force Cadets ranks

References

External links 
 
 
 
 

Junior Reserve Officers' Training Corps
Military insignia
Military ranks of the United States Army
Military ranks of the United States Air Force
Military ranks of the United States Coast Guard
Military ranks of the United States Navy